Martyna Kubka (born 19 April 2001) is a Polish tennis player. She has a career-high WTA ranking of 467 in singles, and a career-high WTA ranking of 245 in doubles, both achieved on 18 July 2022.

Career
Kubka made her WTA Tour main-draw debut at the 2021 WTA Poland Open in the doubles competition. Her singles Tour level debut was at the 2022 Poland Open.

ITF Circuit finals

Singles: 1 (runner–up)

Doubles: 17 (9 titles, 8 runner–ups)

References

External links
 
 

2001 births
Living people
Polish female tennis players
21st-century Polish women